Two Tragedy Poets (...And a Caravan of Weird Figures) is the fifth studio album by Italian folk/power metal band Elvenking. It was released through AFM Records on November 14, 2008.
The album is mostly acoustic; it includes acoustic versions of two older tracks, "The Winter Wake" and "The Wanderer", both from The Winter Wake. The Japanese edition also includes a remake of "Skywards", originally released on the album Heathenreel. Although Elvenking's website says otherwise, instead of "The Wanderer (acoustic version)" being a digipack bonus track, it's "My Little Moon".

The album was preceded by an online single, which included another acoustic version of the band's older song, "The Perpetual Knot".

Track listing
All music and lyrics by Aydan and Damnagoras except "Heaven is a Place on Earth" by Rick Nowels and Ellen Shipley.
 "The Caravan of Weird Figures" – 1:16
 "Another Awful Hobs Tale" – 3:09
 "From Blood to Stone" – 4:11
 "Ask a Silly Question" – 3:30
 "She Lives at Dawn" – 1:24
 "The Winter Wake (acoustic version)" – 4:11
 "Heaven is a Place on Earth" (Belinda Carlisle cover) – 4:11
 "My Own Spider's Web" – 4:21
 "Not My Final Song" – 4:44
 "The Blackest of My Hearts" – 3:30
 "The Wanderer" (acoustic version) – 4:50
 "Miss Conception" – 3:49
 "My Little Moon" (digipack bonus track)
 "Skywards 2008" (Japanese bonus track)

References 

Elvenking (band) albums
2008 albums
AFM Records albums